is a railway station in the town of Kawanishi, Yamagata Prefecture, Japan, operated by the East Japan Railway Company (JR East).

History
Chūgun Station opened on September 28, 1926. The station was absorbed into the JR East network upon the privatization of JNR on 1 April 1987. A new station building was completed in March 2001.

Lines
The station is served by the Yonesaka Line, and is located 12.5 rail kilometers from the terminus of the line at Yonezawa Station.

Station layout
The station has one side platform serving a single bi-directional track. The station is unattended.

Surrounding area

See also
List of Railway Stations in Japan

External links

 JR East Station information 

Railway stations in Yamagata Prefecture
Yonesaka Line
Railway stations in Japan opened in 1926
Railway stations in Japan opened in 1935
Stations of East Japan Railway Company
Kawanishi, Yamagata